Pali Marwar railway station is a major railway station in Pali district, Rajasthan. Its code is PMY. It serves Pali Marwar city. The station consists of two platforms, neither of which is well sheltered. It lacks many facilities including water and sanitation.

Pali got connected to Marwar Junction railway station on 24 June 1882 and to Luni on 17 June 1884. Jodhpur is connected to the district via Luni in 1885 in Rajputana–Malwa Railway network and the first train started on this route on 9 March 1885. This line later becomes part of the Jodhpur–Bikaner Railway.

References

Railway stations in Pali district
Jodhpur railway division